Adutha Kattam is a 1999 Tamil-language romantic drama film written and directed by Sarath, and produced by Ajmal Hassan. The film stars Raja Ravindra and Yuvarani, while Vijayakumar and Cochin Haneefa appear in supporting roles. Featuring music composed by S. P. Venkatesh, the film was released on 26 February 1999.

Cast

Raja Ravindra
Yuvarani
Vijayakumar
Cochin Haneefa
Thalaivasal Vijay
S. S. Chandran
Vennira Aadai Moorthy
K. K. Soundar
Oru Viral Krishna Rao
Mahanadi Shankar
Vichithra
Vinodhini
Amaithipadai Muthukumar
Master Venkatesh
Madhurima
Soruba
Joker Thulasi
Jeyamani
Rajsekhar
Pon Ramachandran
Sundaresan Thankappan

Soundtrack
Soundtrack was composed by S. P. Venkatesh, with lyrics written by Vairamuthu.
"Macham Enakirukku"
"Vaaya Vaaya"
"Adi Sudithaar Sundhariyea"
"Chinna Kannea"
"Karumbukku Vearummbu"
"Chinna Kannea" (Duet)

References

1999 films
1990s Tamil-language films
1999 comedy-drama films
Indian comedy-drama films